The first inscriptions on the UNESCO Memory of the World International Register were made in 1997. By creating a compendium of the world’s documentary heritage—manuscripts, oral traditions, audio-visual materials, library and archive holdings – the program aims to tap on its networks of experts to exchange information and raise resources for the preservation, digitization, and dissemination of documentary materials. As of 2018, 432 documentary heritages have been included in the Register, among them recordings of folk music, ancient languages and phonetics, aged remnants of religious and secular manuscripts, collective lifetime works of renowned giants of literature, science and music, copies of landmark motion pictures and short films, and accounts documenting changes in the world’s political, economic and social stage. Of these, 93 properties were nominated by countries from the region of Latin America and the Caribbean.

List by country/territory

Notes

A. Names and spellings provided are based on the official list released by the Memory of the World Programme.

References

External links
 UNESCO Memory of the World Programme official website
 Memory of the World Register – Latin America and the Caribbean
 Lista completa de documentos registrados
 Programa Memória do Mundo
 Arquivo Rui Barbosa 
 Arquivo Nacional - access to the full Brazilian's list
 iPatrimônio - another way to access the 2020 Brazilian's list

 
Latin America and the Caribbean